The Parthian dress, represented by the Parthians, became the common clothing in the Ancient Near East during the Arsacid era (247 BC – 224 AD). The dress was characterized by its sleeved coats and trousers, and crossed political and ethnic barriers, being worn from Syria to northern India, continuing designs already recorded in the Achaemenid era. Alexander the Great's conquests of the Near East and the ensuing reign of the Seleucid Empire did not mark any change in Iranian clothing, but instead resulted in the further spread of it and even its influence on Greek clothing.

See also
 Central Asian clothing
 Sasanian dress
 Tocharian clothing

References

Sources
 

Parthian Empire
Iranian clothing